Group 8 is a group (column) of chemical elements in the periodic table. It  consists of iron (Fe), ruthenium (Ru), osmium (Os) and hassium (Hs). They are all transition metals.

Like other groups, the members of this family show patterns in electron configuration, especially in the outermost shells, resulting in trends in chemical behavior.

"Group 8" is the modern standard designation for this group, adopted by the IUPAC in 1990. 

In the older group naming systems, this group was combined with groups 9 and 10 and called group "VIIIB" in the Chemical Abstracts Service (CAS) "U.S. system", or "VIII" in the old IUPAC (pre-1990) "European system" (and in Mendeleev's original table).

Group 8 (current IUPAC) should not be confused with "group VIIIA" in the CAS system, which is group 18 (current IUPAC), the noble gases.

While groups (columns) of the periodic table are sometimes named after their lighter member (as in "the oxygen group" for group 16), the term iron group does not mean "group 8".  Most often, it means a set of adjacent elements on period (row) 4 of the table that includes iron, such as chromium, manganese, iron, cobalt, and nickel, or only the last three, or some other set, depending on the context.

Basic properties

The first three elements are hard silvery-white metals.  Hassium has not been isolated in macroscopic pure form, and its properties have not been conclusively observed.

References

Groups (periodic table)